Clotilde Essiane aka Junior (born 6 August 1985) is a Cameroonian boxer, mixed martial artist and a retired footballer, who currently lives in Johannesburg, South Africa.

Football career

Club career
Essiane scored 17 goals for Cameroonian club TKC in 2004. In October 2006, she was registered as a player for Equatorial Guinean club Las Vegas.

International career
Essiane was going to play for the Cameroon national team at the 2004 African Women's Championship, but she missed it due to a tear in her left thigh. Two years later, she was naturalized by Equatorial Guinea to play for its national team.

International goals
Scores and results list Equatorial Guinea's goal tally first

Mixed martial arts career

In 2016, Essiane defeated Bunmi Ojewole from Nigeria and Rushda Mallick and Ansie Van Der Marwe, both from South Africa.

Boxing career

Essiane represented Cameroon at the 2018 Commonwealth Games and she was their flag bearer at the Parade of Nations during the opening ceremony. She lost to Tammara Thibeault from Canada in the women's middleweight competition quarterfinals.

References

External links

1985 births
Living people
Cameroonian women boxers
Boxers at the 2018 Commonwealth Games
Commonwealth Games competitors for Cameroon
Cameroonian female mixed martial artists
Mixed martial artists utilizing boxing
Cameroonian emigrants to South Africa
Cameroonian women's footballers
Women's association football forwards
Equatorial Guinea women's international footballers
Cameroonian expatriate footballers
Cameroonian expatriate sportspeople in Equatorial Guinea
Expatriate footballers in Equatorial Guinea
Naturalized citizens of Equatorial Guinea
Equatoguinean women's footballers
Middleweight boxers